
This is a list of WWF Shotgun Saturday Night episodes including episode number, location, venue and that night's main event.

All dates, venues and main events are per IMDb.

1997

1998

1999

See Also
List of AEW Dynamite episodes
List of WWE Raw special episodes
List of WWE SmackDown special episodes

References

Lists of American non-fiction television series episodes
WWE lists